Gerhard Werner (born 4 March 1947) is a German modern pentathlete. He competed for West Germany at the 1976 Summer Olympics.

References

External links
 

1947 births
Living people
German male modern pentathletes
Olympic modern pentathletes of West Germany
Modern pentathletes at the 1976 Summer Olympics
Sportspeople from Oldenburg